Shreegauri Sawant aka Gauri Sawant is a transgender activist from Mumbai, India. She is the director of Sakhi Char Chowghi that helps transgender people and people with HIV/AIDS. She was featured in an ad by Vicks. She was made the goodwill ambassador of Election Commission in Maharashtra.

Early life 
Sawant was born as Ganesh and raised in Pune. Her mother died when she was seven years old and she was raised by her grandmother. Her father is a police officer. She left her house at the age of 14 or 15 as she didn't want to be a disappointment for her dad.

Activism 
Gauri founded the Sakhi Char Chowghi Trust in 2000. The NGO promotes safe sex and provides counselling to transgender people. In 2014, she became the first transgender person to file a petition in the Supreme Court of India for adoption rights of transgender people. She was a petitioner in the National Legal Services Authority (NALSA) case in which the Supreme Court recognised transgender as the third gender. Gauri adopted a girl named Gayatri in 2008 after Gayatri's mother died of AIDS.

Personal life and family
Gauri has an adopted daughter, whom she adopted at the age of 4. Gauri said in an interview that she had adopted her after her biological mother, a sex worker who had died from AIDS, leaving her alone, to be sold in the sex-trafficking industry.

In popular culture 
In 2017, Gauri was featured in an ad by Vicks. The ad was part of Vicks' ‘Touch of Care’ campaign and showed the story of Gauri and her adopted daughter.

In 2022, a web series Taali featuring Sushmita Sen in the role of Gaurii Sawant was announced.

References 

Indian LGBT people
Transgender rights activists
Indian LGBT rights activists
Year of birth missing (living people)
Living people